Jaya Super Singer South India is a reality-based Indian Tamil-language singing competition that was broadcast on Jaya TV. The program seeks to discover playback singing talent in South India.

The show debuted on 20 September 2014, airing on weekend nights at 8:00pm on Jaya TV. The final episode was telecast on 30 August 2015.

Season 1
Season 1 of the show is directed by MS Senthil Kumar.

Auditions

Open auditions
The open auditions, the first stage in determining a seasons finalists, were conducted in the South Indian states of Tamil Nadu, Andhra Pradesh, Karnataka and Kerala. During this stage, contestants sing a song or two before a panel of preliminary state audition judges. This panel then decides on-the-spot whether the contestant demonstrated enough ability and performance value to proceed further. If the contestant exhibited exceptional ability in their performance, judges award a "ticket" moving them instantly one step forward in the competition. Alternatively, if judges are on the fence about the singer, they will place the contestant on a waitlist until the end of that day's auditions. Otherwise, if the contestant lacks the ability and performance value to proceed further, the contestant will be rejected.

Selection of top 20 - final level auditions

Spot Selection Round (1 November 2014 – 23 November 2014)
In the second and final stage of the audition process, contestants shortlisted from the open auditions arrive in a central location in Chennai. They are expected to perform a song or two before a different panel of judges with a view of being selected as top 20 finalists of the show.

For this stage of the process, the program host asserts that it is distinct from other reality shows as it does not embarrass unsuccessful contestants in the show by actively 'rejecting' them on the spot; rather, it actively encourages contestants in this stage to continue to improve their singing skills.

Again, this panel then decides on-the-spot whether the contestant demonstrated enough ability and performance value to proceed further. If the contestant exhibited exceptional ability in their performance, judges award a "green card" shortlisting them instantly one step forward in the competition towards finalist selection. Otherwise, if judges are on the fence about the singer, they will ask the contestant to wait for a decision at the end of the final level auditions.

Episode 13 (1 November 2014)
 Judges: music director Bharadwaj, veteran playback singer S. P. Sailaja, and Carnatic music exponent Nithyasree Mahadevan
 Host: Shriranjani
 Performances:

 – Special performance by non-contestant performer 
 – Contestant spot-selected to advance to next round
 – Contestant waitlisted then selected on subsequent episode

Episode 14 (2 November 2014)
 Judges: music director Bharadwaj, veteran playback singer S.P. Sailaja, and Carnatic music exponent Nithyasree Mahadevan
 Host: Shriranjani
 Performances:

 – Contestant spot-selected to advance to next round
 – Contestant waitlisted then selected on subsequent episode

Episode 15 (8 November 2014)
 Judges: music director Bharadwaj, veteran playback singer S.P. Sailaja, and Carnatic music exponent Nithyasree Mahadevan
 Host: Shriranjani
 Performances:

No contestants were spot-selected to advance to the next round in this episode.

 – Contestant waitlisted then selected on subsequent episode

Episode 16 (9 November 2014)
 Judges: music director Bharadwaj, veteran playback singer S.P. Sailaja, and Carnatic music exponent Nithyasree Mahadevan
 Host: Shriranjani
 Performances:

 – Contestant spot-selected to advance to next round
 – Contestant waitlisted then selected on subsequent episode

Episode 17 (15 November 2014)
 Judges: music director Bharadwaj, veteran playback singer S.P. Sailaja, and Carnatic music exponent Nithyasree Mahadevan
 Host: Shriranjani
 Performances:

No contestants were spot-selected to advance to the next round in this episode.

 – Contestant waitlisted then selected on subsequent episode

Episode 18 (16 November 2014)
 Judges: music director Bharadwaj, veteran playback singer S.P. Sailaja, and Carnatic music exponent Nithyasree Mahadevan
 Host: Shriranjani
 Performances:

No contestants were spot-selected to advance to the next round in this episode.

 – Special performance by guest judge/performer 
 – Contestant waitlisted then selected on subsequent episode

Episode 19 (22 November 2014)
 Judges: music director Bharadwaj, veteran playback singer S.P. Sailaja, and Carnatic music exponent Nithyasree Mahadevan
 Host: Shriranjani
 Performances:

No contestants were spot-selected to advance to the next round in this episode.

 – Contestant waitlisted then selected on subsequent episode

Episode 20 (23 November 2014)
 Judges: music director Bharadwaj, veteran playback singer S.P. Sailaja, and Carnatic music exponent Nithyasree Mahadevan
 Host: Shriranjani
 Performances:

At the conclusion of the auditions in this episode, the judges announced 10 of the top 20 finalists they selected to enter the competition this season. This included a recap of spot selected contestants from previous episodes in this round of auditions.

 – Contestant spot-selected to advance to next round
 – Contestant waitlisted then selected on subsequent episode

= Spot-selected contestants =

Solo Introduction Round (29 November 2014 – 14 December 2014) 
 Judges: music director Bharadwaj, veteran playback singer S.P. Sailaja, and Carnatic music exponent Nithyasree Mahadevan
 Host: Vaishali
 Performances:

The 10 finalists announced at the conclusion of episode 20, as well as 16 other contestants, were expected to perform over two performances rounds. The first round of performances were announced as the 'introduction' round. The second round of performances were announced as the 'duet' round. At the conclusion of the performances from both rounds, the judges were expected make a decision as to which other 10 contestants should be selected as top 20 finalists.

This round required solo performances from the contestants.

Duet Introduction Round (20 December 2014 – 28 December 2014) 
 Judges: music director Bharadwaj, veteran playback singer S.P. Sailaja, and Carnatic music exponent Nithyasree Mahadevan
 Host: Vaishali
 Performances:

This round required duet performances from the contestants. At the conclusion of this round, the judges announced their decision as to the remaining contestants selected as top 20 finalists. The judges confirmed that although it was not possible for all contestants to participate in all rounds for various reasons (such as illness, exam studies, difficulties traveling interstate at an agreed time, and so forth), a decision was made taking into account the overall potential of each contestant from their performances to-date. After the judges announced the names of the other selected contestants, the host pointed out that 12 contestants were named instead of 10. The judges asserted the last two named contestants were lucky surprise selections but warned that those contestants should not become complacent as they were allowed into the competition by half marks.

Selected wait-listed contestants

Top 22 contestants
Shrinidhi is from Hyderabad, Andhra Pradesh. She received training in Carnatic music from prominent vocalist, Nedunuri Krishnamoorthy.

Lekshmi Jayan is from Kerala.

Somadas is from Kerala.

Prathipaa is from Kerala.

Keshav Vinodh initially auditioned at Chennai, Tamil Nadu.

Tanuj Nair initially auditioned at Chennai, Tamil Nadu.

Sindhuja Srinivasan is from Hyderabad, Andhra Pradesh.

Aathreya Ganapathy initially auditioned at Chennai, Tamil Nadu.

Nellaiappan Ram initially auditioned at Chennai, Tamil Nadu.

Nisar Rutin Shah is from Kerala.

Vaanathishri initially auditioned at Coimbatore, Tamil Nadu.

Sai Ramya auditioned at Hyderabad, Andhra Pradesh.

Saariga S. Ganga is from Kerala.

Larson Cyril initially auditioned at Coimbatore, Tamil Nadu. He previously appeared on Jaya TV's Ragamalika series.

Vasundhara Shivakumar initially auditioned at Bangalore, Karnataka.

Ajay Krishna Madurai, Tamil Nadu.

Madhumathi Venkat initially auditioned at Bangalore, Karnataka.

Shaanthini is from Kerala.

Sathish Kumar is from Bangalore, Karnataka.

Aravindh initially auditioned at Chennai, Tamil Nadu.

Anusha Ravi initially auditioned at Chennai, Tamil Nadu.

Ajay initially auditioned at Chennai, Tamil Nadu, and only just made it as a contestant on the show. However, he ceased appearing as a contestant on the show after the New Year Celebration Round.

Competition performance rounds

Contestant elimination chart
Contestants' listed in the order in which the finalists were announced as selected during the final audition rounds.

Main competition rounds
Contestants and special performers were accompanied by Ganesh Kirupa Light Music Orchestra.

New Year (2015) Celebration Round - 2014 Hits (3 January 2015 – 11 January 2015)
 Judges: veteran playback singer S. P. Sailaja, music director Bharadwaj, and Carnatic music exponent Nithyasree Mahadevan
 Host: Vaishali
 Performances:

The first finals round of the season was telecast on 2 January 2015 in celebration of the New Year. The host announced this round as a celebration round in which no contestants would be eliminated. The top 22 contestants were required to perform hits from Tamil films released in the previous year, 2014. Before the performances were underway, an announcement was also made that as a New Year's gift, the best performing contestant(s) would be given a playback singing opportunity by music director Bharadwaj, one of the show's judges.

 – Special performance by non-contestant performer

Tribute to "K.B Sir" Round (17 January 2015 – 8 February 2015) 
 Judges: veteran playback singer S. P. Sailaja, music director Bharadwaj, and Carnatic music exponent Nithyasree Mahadevan
 Special Guest Judges: veteran playback singer Vani Jairam (episodes 35, 36, 37, 38, & 39), comedian actor Vivek (episodes 37 & 38) and playback violinist M. Kalyan (episodes 40, 41, 42, 43 & 44)
 Host: Vaishali
 Performances:

This unique round was in tribute to prominent film director, K. Balachander ("K.B Sir"). Throughout this round, each of the judges and chief guests made detailed comments filled with anecdotes about their experiences with the film director during their careers.

Musical performances by the judges, chief guests, and top 21 contestants during this round consisted of songs featured in films directed by K. Balachander.

Contestant Ajay did not participate or appear on the show for this round, and it was announced in the next round that he was no longer participating in the competition.

Contestant Shrinidhi gave a stand-out performance.

 – Special performance by non-contestant performer

Remake Song Round (14 February 2015 – 28 February 2015) 

This unique round required the top 21 contestants to perform hit Tamil film songs which were remade from hit film songs in other South Indian languages (Telugu, Malayalam and Kannada languages). The first part of the round consisted of solo performances, and the second part consisted of duet performances.

At the commencement of the round, it was announced that contestant Ajay was no longer able to participate in the competition for an unavoidable reason, and that the next waitlisted contestant would be announced in the next round.

Solo Performances 
 Judges: veteran playback singer S. P. Sailaja, music director Bharadwaj, and Carnatic music exponent Nithyasree Mahadevan
 Host: Vaishali
 Performances:

Contestant Lekshmi Jayan could not attend the set to perform for this round for unavoidable reasons, but was permitted to sing a song for this round via telephone link.

 – Special performance by non-contestant performer

Duet Performances 
 Judges: veteran playback singer S. P. Sailaja and music director Bharadwaj
 Host: Vaishali
 Performances:

The host noted that Nithyasree Mahadevan was unable to attend to judge the show in this week's episode.

 – Special performance by non-contestant performer

"Puratchi Thalaivi" Birthday Celebration Round (8 March 2015 – 29 March 2015) 
This unique round was in tribute to Puratchi Thalaivi ("Revolutionary Leader"): politician, actress, and artist, Jayalalithaa. The round celebrated Jayalalithaa's birthday and contributions. The first part of the round consisted of solo performances, and the second part consisted of duet performances.

In celebration of the show reaching a 50th episode milestone, veteran playback singer P. Susheela graciously accepted an invitation to appear on the show as a special guest judge over the first three episodes in this round.

Solo Performances 
 Judges: veteran playback singer S. P. Sailaja, music director Bharadwaj, and Carnatic music exponent Nithyasree Mahadevan
 Special Guest Judge: veteran playback singer P. Susheela (episodes 50, 51, and 52)
 Host: Vaishali
 Performances:

 – Special performance by non-contestant performer

Duet Performances 
 Judges: veteran playback singer S. P. Sailaja, music director Bharadwaj, and Carnatic music exponent Nithyasree Mahadevan
 Host: Vaishali
 Performances:

Judge S. P. Sailaja's comments throughout episode 55 were especially noteworthy. During episode 56, S. P. Sailaja also recounted in detail the circumstances surrounding her brother, S. P. Balasubrahmanyam singing the song Aayiram Nilave Vaa which was appreciated by viewers of the show.

Stage Songs Round (4 April 2015 – 12 April 2015)
 Judges: veteran playback singer S. P. Sailaja, music director Bharadwaj, and Carnatic music exponent Nithyasree Mahadevan (except episode 60)
 Host: Vaishali
 Performances:

This round required the contestants to perform songs belong to a "stage song" genre, such as film songs which were picturised on a concert stage. The host and judges S. P. Sailaja and Bharadwaj noted that Nithyasree Mahadevan was unable to attend to judge the show in episode 60.

Before the commencement of the round, the judges gave detailed comments filled with anecdotes about their experience when they each performed on a concert stage for the first time.

The exchange between host Vaishali and contestant Vaanathishri before her performance in episode 59 was enjoyed by viewers, as was the exchange between Bharadwaj and Vaishali before the beginning of episode 60.

 – Special performance by non-contestant performer

Pudhu Mugam Arimugam Round (18 April 2015 – 26 April 2015)
 Judges: veteran playback singer S. P. Sailaja and music director Bharadwaj 
 Host: Vaishali
 Performances:

This "Pudhu Mugam Arimugam" (New Face Debut) Round required the contestants to perform songs featured in films released between 2011 and 2015 by film directors making their debut in Tamil cinema.

 – Special performance by non-contestant performer

Hero Heroine Introduction Round (2 May 2015 – 10 May 2015)
 Judge: music director Bharadwaj 
 Guest Judges: violinist Padma Shankar (episodes 65 & 66 only) & vocalist Binny Krishnakumar

 – Special performance by non-contestant performer

Dedication Round (16 May 2015 – 24 May 2015)
 Judge: music director Bharadwaj 
 Guest Judges: violinist Padma Shankar & vocalist Binny Krishnakumar

Contestants had an opportunity to sing a song of their choice in dedication a person or people of their choice.

In episode 69, contestant Shrinidhi confirmed she was a disciple of prominent Carnatic music vocalist Nedunuri Krishnamoorthy, and judge Binny Krishnakumar confirmed she was a disciple of M. Balamuralikrishna.

Challenging Round (30 May 2015 – 7 June 2015)
 Judge: music director Bharadwaj 
 Guest Judges: violinist Padma Shankar & vocalist Binny Krishnakumar

SPB & Raajaa Birthday Celebration Round (13 June 2015 – 27 June 2015)
 Judges: music director Bharadwaj, veteran playback singer S. P. Sailaja & guest Binny Krishnakumar
 Special Guest: Prabhakar (Ilaiyaraaja's senior violin conductor)

This round celebrated the birthdays of playback singer, S. P. Balasubrahmanyam ("SPB"), and music director Ilaiyaraaja ("Raajaa"). Contestants were required to perform songs sung by SPB and composed by Raajaa. Special guest Prabhakar gave outstanding advice to the contestants, and to all music students generally at the commencement of the round. SPB's sister, S. P. Sailaja, returned to judge the show.

 – Special performance by non-contestant performer

Family Songs Round (28 June 2015 – 12 July 2015)
 Judges: music director Bharadwaj, veteran playback singer S. P. Sailaja & guest Binny Krishnakumar
 Special Guest Judges: Film director Vikraman (episode 86 only) & Carnatic music singers Priya Sisters (episodes 82 & 83 only)
 Host: Vaishali

Voice Change Round (18 July 2015 – 1 August 2015)
 Judges: music director Bharadwaj, veteran playback singer S. P. Sailaja & guest Binny Krishnakumar
 Host: Vaishali

This Maatru Kural Suttru ("Change Voice Round") required male contestants to perform film songs sung by female playback singers, and for female contestants to perform film songs sung by male playback singers.

Quarter Finals Round: Tribute to MSV (2 August 2015 – 16 August 2015)
 Judges: veteran playback singer S. P. Sailaja, music director Bharadwaj, & Carnatic music exponent Nithyasree Mahadevan (episodes 92 & 93 only) 
 Guest Judges: violinist Padma Shankar & vocalist Binny Krishnakumar
 Host: Vaishali

The quarter finals round required the contestants to attend and perform songs composed by music director M. S. Viswanathan, who died earlier in the month. Nithyasree Mahadevan returned to judge the music competition reality show which pleased viewers. Nithyasree confirmed during episode 92 that she requested to be excused from attending several episodes due to commitments she made prior to the start of the competition.

Following the last performances of the round in episode 95, the judges announced their decision in respect of eliminating contestants. Bharadwaj announced that contestant Somadas and contestant Sariga S. Ganga were eliminated for being absent and failing to perform, which viewers agreed with. S. P. Sailaja announced that due to unavoidable circumstances, contestants Shrinidhi & Sai Ramya were unable to attend to perform in this round, but as performances could only be judged after attendance, both contestants were unfortunately eliminated by default. Other than these 4 contestants, the judges also eliminated 7 participating contestants: Sathish, Aravindh, Nellaiappan, Tanuj, Madhumathi, Prathipaa, and Sindhujaa. Viewers disagreed with the decision to eliminate Shrinidhi, Madhumathi, and Nellaiappan.

Highlight Performances 

 – Performance by non-contestant

External links 
 Jaya TV Schedule
 Super singer

Jaya TV television series
Tamil-language reality television series
Tamil-language singing talent shows
2010s Tamil-language television series
2014 Tamil-language television series debuts
Tamil-language game shows
Tamil-language television shows
2015 Tamil-language television series endings